Publius Servilius Casca Longus (died c. 42 BC) was one of the assassins of Julius Caesar. He and several other senators conspired to kill him, a plan which they carried out on 15 March, 44 BC. Afterwards, Casca fought with the liberators during the Liberators' civil war. He is believed to have died by suicide after their defeat at the Battle of Philippi in 42 BC.

Life
Despite his being initially a childhood friend of Caesar, Casca and his brother Titedius joined in the assassination. Casca struck the first blow, attacking Caesar from behind and hitting his bare shoulders, after Tillius Cimber had distracted the dictator by grabbing his toga. Caesar replied "Casca, you villain, what are you doing?" and tussled with him for several seconds. Casca simultaneously shouted to his brother in Greek, "Brother, help me!" The other assassins then joined in.

At the time Casca held the office of tribune of the plebs. After the assassination he fled Rome, and his colleague in the tribunate, Publius Titius, had him deprived of his office. Casca joined Marcus Junius Brutus and Gaius Cassius Longinus, the leaders of the assassins, during the Liberators' civil war against the Second Triumvirate, Caesar's former supporters. He seems to have died, probably by suicide, in the aftermath of their defeat at the Battle of Philippi, in October 42 BC.

Casca is commemorated on a coin along with Brutus, in which a bearded figure is depicted next to his name. However, this appears to be the god Neptune rather than a portrait of Casca.

A house containing a table inscribed with his name is found in Pompeii.

Dramatic depictions

 He is called "envious Casca" by Mark Antony in William Shakespeare's play Julius Caesar (1599):
"See what a rent the envious Casca made". The two words became the title of a mystery novel by Georgette Heyer.
 In the 1934 film Cleopatra, Casca is portrayed by Edwin Maxwell.
 In the 1937–38 Mercury Theatre stage production Caesar, Publius was played by Joseph Cotten.
 In the 1953 film of Shakespeare's Julius Caesar, Casca is portrayed by Edmond O'Brien.
 In the 1963 film Cleopatra, Casca is portrayed by Carroll O'Connor.
 In the 1970 film of Shakespeare's Julius Caesar, Casca is portrayed by Robert Vaughn.
 In the 1999 miniseries  Cleopatra, Casca is portrayed by David Schofield.
 In the TV series Rome (2005–07), Casca is portrayed by Peter Gevisser.

See also
Servilia gens

References

External links

Appian, The Civil Wars, Book 2 Chapter 16 from the Perseus Project
Plutarch, Lives, Caesar, Chapter 66 from the Perseus Project
Brutus - Casca coin

42 BC deaths
1st-century BC Romans
Ancient Roman politicians
Ancient Roman politicians who committed suicide
Assassins of Julius Caesar
Casca, Publius
Suicides in Italy
Year of birth unknown